The Tees Valley Line is a rail route, in Northern England, following part of the original Stockton and Darlington Railway route of 1825.

Service
Services on the Tees Valley Line are operated by Northern Trains, with an hourly service running between Saltburn and Bishop Auckland, and half-hourly trains to Darlington. 

Additional Northern Trains services operate along the Tees Valley Line during the morning peak, with some journeys between Middlesbrough and Newcastle running along the East Coast Main Line, rather than the Durham Coast Line. 

TransPennine Express also operate along part of the Tees Valley Line, with hourly services from Redcar Central and Middlesbrough to York, Leeds and Manchester Airport. 

Predominantly, rolling stock on the Tees Valley Line consists of Class 156 and Class 158 diesel multiple units operated by Northern Trains, as well Class 185 diesel multiple units operated by TransPennine Express. 

The Class 156 and 158 units operating on the Tees Valley Line are currently in the process of being refurbished, with upgrades including free WiFi, power sockets, on-board passenger information displays, and an interior refresh. 

Class 185 units operated by TransPennine Express were refurbished as part of a £32 million investment, with the work being completed in 2018. 

Class 142 'Pacer' trains also served the line on Northern services, until the turn of the new decade, when they were withdrawn from passenger service. 

The route serves the following stations: Bishop Auckland, Shildon, Newton Aycliffe, Heighington, North Road (Darlington), Darlington, Dinsdale, Teesside Airport, Allens West, Eaglescliffe, Thornaby, Middlesbrough, South Bank, Redcar Central, Redcar East, Longbeck, Marske and Saltburn.

History

The section of line between Bishop Auckland and Darlington (prior to joining the East Coast Main Line), as well as the section between Dinsdale (near Middleton St. George) and Eaglescliffe, follow the original route of the Stockton & Darlington Railway, which dates back to 1825.

The line from Middlesbrough to Saltburn, as well as the freight only line to Boulby Mine, were part of the Whitby, Redcar & Middlesbrough Union Railway, until the line's closure on 5 May 1958.

In March 2015, a  electrified siding was laid adjacent to the Tees Valley Line, just south of Heighington. This allows low-speed testing of the trains manufactured at the nearby Hitachi Rail plant at Newton Aycliffe, including TOPS classes 800, 801, 805, 807, 810 and 385.

Least-used stations
Prior to the suspension of services to Redcar British Steel in 2019, the Tees Valley Line was home to two of the country's least-used rail stations.

Redcar British Steel
In 2017-18, Redcar British Steel was the least-used station in Britain, with an estimated 40 passenger journeys made.

Prior to service suspension in December 2019, Redcar British Steel was served by two trains during the morning peak (07:57 to Bishop Auckland & 08:25 to Saltburn), and two during the evening peak (16:58 to Middlesbrough & 18:17 to Saltburn).

Teesside Airport
In 2012–13 and 2013–14, Teesside Airport was the least-used station in the country, with just 8 passenger journeys made per year, in both periods.

As of the December 2019 timetable change, Teesside Airport is currently served by a once-weekly parliamentary service. Currently, the single Sunday service, commencing at Hartlepool, is timetabled to call at Teesside Airport at 14:54, before continuing through to Darlington.

Stations

References

External links

GenMaps - Maps of Durham, Yorkshire 1885
NPEMaps - Maps of area circa 1950
Network Rail maps of Route 9 - North East Routes
North Eastern Railway Tour 2000
Communigate - Grangetown streets and buildings
The Bishop Line

Railway lines in North East England
Rail transport in County Durham
Rail transport in North Yorkshire
Transport in Middlesbrough
Community railway lines in England